Ruhuhucerberus is a genus of very large, extinct gorgonopsian therapsids which existed in Tanzania during the Late Permian. Its fossils are found in the Penman Kawinga Formation of the Ruhuhu Basin. It existed sympatrically with the even larger Rubidgea.

References

Gorgonopsia
Prehistoric therapsid genera
Lopingian synapsids of Africa
Lopingian genus first appearances
Lopingian genus extinctions